Dehuiyeh (also Romanized as Dehū‘īyeh, Dehūyeh, and Dehvieh; also known as Dehū and Qal‘eh-ye Dohū) is a village in Khir Rural District, Runiz District, Estahban County, Fars Province, Iran. At the 2006 census, its population was 102, in 26 families.

References 

Populated places in Estahban County